Cychrus angulicollis is a species of ground beetle in the subfamily of Carabinae. It was described by Stella in 1874. The species can be found in France and Italy.

References

angulicollis
Beetles described in 1874